NGC 5678 is a barred spiral galaxy in the constellation Draco. It was discovered by William Herschel on April 17, 1789.

See also
 List of NGC objects (5001–6000)

References

External links
 

Barred spiral galaxies
Draco (constellation)
5678